Y Sagittarii  is a variable star in the constellation of Sagittarius. It is a Cepheid variable with an apparent magnitude that ranges around +5.77. The measure of its parallax by Hubble Space Telescope puts Y Sagittarii to 1,293 light-years away from the Solar System.

The brightness ranges in Y Sagittarii's apparent magnitude varies from +5.25 and +6.24 in a period of 5.7736 days. The  spectral type of this star is F8II, while the effective temperature is 5370 K. It has a radius 50 times larger than the Sun, while its projected rotational velocity of 16 km / s and it has an estimated mass six times that of the Sun. The star's metal content is similar to Sun, with an index of metallicity [Fe / H] = +0.05. For other metals tested, it shows some overabundance of copper, zinc, yttrium and sodium; the level of the elements is almost double that of the Sun ([Na / H] = +0.27).

There is evidence that Y Sagittarii may be a spectroscopic binary. It has been suggested that the orbital period for the system is on the order of 10,000 to 12,000 days. However, subsequent studies assume eccentricity zero for orbit, and they have failed to find a convincing orbital solution. Instead, it appears to be a distant visual companion.

References 

F-type bright giants
Sagittarius (constellation)
Durchmusterung objects
168608
089968
6863
Sagittarii, Y